Seavey may refer to:

Places
Seavey House (disambiguation)
Seavey Township, Aitkin County, Minnesota, United States
Seavey's Island, New Hampshire, United States

People
Dan Seavey (1865–1949), American entrepreneur and outlaw
Daniel Seavey (born 1999), member of American boy band Why Don't We